Desbiens is a ville in the Canadian province of Quebec, located in Lac-Saint-Jean-Est Regional County Municipality. It is on the shores of Lac Saint-Jean at the mouth of the Métabetchouane River.

Demographics 

Population trend:
 Population in 2021: 995 (2016 to 2021 population change: -3.2%)
 Population in 2016: 1028 
 Population in 2011: 1053 
 Population in 2006: 1074
 Population in 2001: 1128
 Population in 1996: 1202
 Population in 1991: 1265

Mother tongue:
 English as first language: 0%
 French as first language: 98.6%
 English and French as first language: 0%
 Other as first language: 1.4%

See also
 List of cities in Quebec

References

Cities and towns in Quebec
Incorporated places in Saguenay–Lac-Saint-Jean